Yasuhisa is a masculine Japanese given name.

Possible writings
Yasuhisa can be written using different combinations of kanji characters. Here are some examples:

康久, "healthy, long time"
康尚, "healthy, still"
康寿, "healthy, long life"
靖久, "peaceful, long time"
靖尚, "peaceful, still"
靖寿, "peaceful, long life"
安久, "tranquil, long time"
安尚, "tranquil, still"
安寿, "tranquil, long life"
保久, "preserve, long time"
保尚, "preserve, still"
保寿, "preserve, long life"
泰久, "peaceful, long time"
泰尚, "peaceful, still"
泰寿, "peaceful, long life"
易久, "divination, long time"
易寿, "divination, long life"
恭久, "respectful, long life"

The name can also be written in hiragana やすひさ or katakana ヤスヒサ.

Notable people with the name
 (born 1986), Japanese actor
 (born 1952), Japanese aikidoka
 (born 1950), Japanese politician
, Japanese acoustical engineer

Japanese masculine given names